Zacatecas, Mexico, may refer to:

Zacatecas, one of the states of Mexico
Zacatecas City, capital city of that state